The Mecke reagent is used as a simple spot-test to presumptively identify alkaloids as well as other compounds. It is composed of a mixture of selenous acid and concentrated sulfuric acid, which is dripped onto the substance being tested.

The United States Department of Justice method for producing the reagent is the addition of 100 mL of concentrated (95–98%) sulfuric acid to 1 g of selenous acid.

See also
Drug checking
Dille–Koppanyi reagent
Folin's reagent
Froehde reagent
Liebermann reagent
Mandelin reagent
Marquis reagent
Simon's reagent
 Zwikker reagent

References

External links
 DHPedia - Mecke Reagent: A comprehensive list of colour reactions (inducing photographs of results)

Chemical tests
Analytical reagents
Drug testing reagents